The Radeon RX 7000 series is a series of graphics processing units developed by AMD, based on their RDNA 3 architecture. It was announced on November 3, 2022 and is the successor to the Radeon RX 6000 series. Currently AMD has announced two graphics cards of the 7000 series, RX 7900 XT and RX 7900 XTX. AMD officially launched the RX 7900 XT and RX 7900 XTX on December 13, 2022.

Radeon RX 7000 series features 
 RDNA 3 microarchitecture 
 Up to 96 Compute Units (CU) compared to the maximum of 80 in the RX 6000 series
 New dual-issue shaders in each CU with the ability to execute two instructions per cycle
 First consumer graphics card to be based on a chiplet design
 TSMC N5 for 
 TSMC N6 for 
 Up to 24GB of GDDR6 memory
 Doubled L1 cache from 128 KB to 256 KB per array
 50% increased L2 cache from 4 MB to 6 MB maximum
 Second-generation Infinity Cache with up to 2.7x peak bandwidth and up to 96MB in capacity
 PCIe 4.0 x16 interface
 Second-generation Ray tracing accelerators
 Added dedicated AI accelerators
 Support for AV1 hardware encoding and decoding for 12-bit video up to 8K60
 New "Radiance Display" Engine with:
 DisplayPort 2.1 UHBR 13.5 support (up to 54 Gbit/s bandwidth)
 HDMI 2.1a support (up to 48 Gbit/s bandwidth)
 Support up to 8K 165 Hz or 4K 480 Hz output with DSC
 12-bit color and Rec. 2020 support for HDR

Navi 3x dies

Navi 31 
The Navi 31 die features 58 billion transistors, a 165% increase in transistor density than the previous generation Navi 2x. The full Navi 31 die contained 12,288 FP32 cores, equivalent to 6144 Stream Processors. Reportedly, the Navi 31 die has been designed to scale up to 3GHz frequency, though AMD's Radeon RX 7900 XTX reference design can hit a boost frequency of 2.5GHz. The Navi 31 die is fabricated on TSMC's N5 process node.

Navi 33 
The Navi 33 die features 13.3 billion transistors and a die size of 204 mm2. The full die features 4096 FP32 cores segmented into 32 Compute Units. Unlike the higher-end Navi 31 and Navi 32 dies, it is a monolithic design fabricated on TSMC's N6 process node.

Products

Desktop

Mobile

Issues

Idle power usage 
Abnormally high power draw while at idle was observed with the Radeon RX 7900 XT and RX 7900 XTX when using select high resolution, high refresh rate displays and when the GPU is decoding video. ComputerBase discovered that the RX 7900 XT and RX 7900 XTX drew a respective 71W and 80W when decoding and playing a 4K 60FPS YouTube video compared to the 30W used by the RX 6900 XT for the same task. AMD acknowledged the issue and it was added to the list of known isues to be addressed with future updates to drivers and Radeon Adrenalin software. On December 22, 2022, Adrenalin Edition 22.12.2 was released and its RDNA 3-exclusive driver significantly reduced the GPU's power usage at idle and when decoding video.

Reference card temperature issues 
AMD's reference editions of the Radeon RX 7900 XT and RX 7900 XTX have suffered from high temperatures of up to 109°C on the GPU hot spot. AIB partner cards were reportedly not affected. The noisy fans and thermal throttling on reference cards coud be as a result of poor contact between the reference cooler and the GPU chiplets. HardwareLuxx instead considered that the direct die cooling used for the Navi 31 chiplets could be difficult due to uneven contact pressure across the seven dies even if they may look to be level. AMD issued a statement in December 2022 that it was investigating the issue. AMD said that the noisy fans and thermal throttling on reference cards were due to a manufacturing defect where there was an insufficient amount of water in vapor chambers. Affected cards would be replaced by AMD upon request.

On January 6, 2023, Scott Herkelman, Senior Vice President & General Manager Graphics at AMD, said in an interview with PCWorld that "you would see a small performance delta" if the GPU throttles at 110°C during certain workloads. Some media outlets disagreed with statements made by Herkelman, such as saying that there was "a small performance delta" when 3 out of 4 affected 7900 XTX performed worse than a previous generation 6900 XT in the same test. Usually, the 7900 XTX performs 30–60% better than a 6900 XT.

See also 
 Radeon RX 5000 series - based on first implementation of RDNA architecture
 Radeon RX 6000 series - AMD's predecessor to Radeon RX 7000 series (RDNA 2 based)
 Radeon Pro - AMD's workstation graphics solution
 List of AMD graphics processing units
 GeForce 40 series - competing Nvidia architecture releasing in a similar time-frame

References

External links 
 Official website

Computer-related introductions in 2022
AMD graphics cards
Graphics processing units
Graphics cards